Beyond Reason is a 1970 Australian post-apocalyptic drama film.

Plot
Nuclear war breaks out and the staff and patients of a mental hospital take refuge in an underground bunker and accidentally get locked in. Discipline soon disintegrates and the patients, led by Richard, start to resist authority. Richard devises a scheme for a new social order where the sane will take no part. The doctors try to resist but are ultimately overcome.

Cast
George Dixon as Dr Sullivan
Magie Copeland as Marion
Ray Fellow as Dr De Groot
Louise Hall as Rita
Ollie Ven Skevics as Richard
John Gauci
Pat Palmer
Robert Henderson
Victor Pandov
Glenda Wynack
Tom Melvold
Joan Hall
Lola Russell
Andrew Gaty

Production
The film marked an attempt by Giorgia Mangiamele to make a more commercial feature than his first, being shot in colour, and using professional writers. The budget was raised by private investors and Magiamele's camera and recording equipment were sold after shooting to help pay lab charges. It was shot over three weeks in August 1968 mostly at a large underground room at the Royal Melbourne Institute of Technology.

Release
Although the film obtained distribution from Columba Pictures, commercial reception was poor.

The director expressed dissatisfaction with the final product, saying that "I had no time to make the images look good. It was shot in a couple of weeks for TV."

References

External links
Beyond Reason at IMDb
Beyond Reason at Oz Movies

1970 drama films
Australian action adventure films
Australian post-apocalyptic films
Films about nuclear war and weapons
Films shot in Melbourne
1970s English-language films
1970s Australian films